The Hegy "El Chuparosa" is a homebuilt, enclosed-cockpit biplane that was designed in the early 1950s.

Design and development
The aircraft was designed to be a low-cost, high performance aircraft. The Ray Hegy design used full size wall drawings and wooden mock-ups. The aircraft was started in February 1950 and finished in May 1959 with the prototype displayed at the Rockford EAA Fly-In in 1960.

"El Chuparosa" is a single place biplane featuring a short fuselage with a tail swept to a sharp tip. The fuselage cross section was based on the Heath Parasol design. The fuselage was constructed from welded steel tubing, with wooden wing spars from a J-3 Cub, the ailerons were made from 1929 Douglas O-38 rudders and the engine cheeks cowlings were made from Fairchild 24 wheelpants. The cockpit is enclosed.

Operational history
The prototype "El Chuparosa" was donated to the EAA Airventure Museum in Oshkosh, Wisconsin on August 14, 1977.

Specifications (Hegy R.C.H.I. “El Chuparosa”)

See also

References

External links

El Chuparosa at Oshkosh 1970

Homebuilt aircraft